The Lincoln Theatre is a theater located on 135th Street near Lenox Avenue in Harlem, New York City. It opened in 1915 and was the first theater in a then predominantly white neighborhood in Harlem to cater to black audiences. The theater reached its peak of fame in the 1920s, when entertainers such as Bessie Smith, Florence Mills, and Fats Waller headlined. (Fats Waller had been hired as the organ player of the theater when he was fifteen years old.) The Lincoln Theatre was the only place in New York where Ma Rainey performed.

Background 
The theater was originally a nickelodeon called the Nickelette. In 1909, the building was purchased by Maria C. Downs, who increased the seating and changed its name to the Lincoln Theatre. Due to the Great Migration happening around this time, more African Americans were moving to Harlem; however, many of the theaters in Harlem were segregated or completely closed to black audiences. Downs made the Lincoln into a theater for black people, hosting black shows and black performers, then had the current Lincoln Theatre building constructed in 1915.

References

External links
 Photograph of the theater in 1936

Harlem
Theatres in New York City